Streptophlebia obliquistria is a moth in the family Erebidae. It was described by George Hampson in 1898. It is found on Borneo.

References

Moths described in 1898
Syntomini